Wokurna is a locality in the Mid North region of South Australia to the west of the Barunga Range and southeast of Port Broughton.

The name Wokurna is believed to be an Aboriginal word for "to arrive". There was a school in the area from 1888 to 1923.

Part of the Snowtown Wind Farm is on the ridge on the eastern edge of Wokurna.

References

Towns in South Australia